Nitosaurus is an extinct genus of non-mammalian synapsids.

See also

 List of pelycosaurs
 List of therapsids

References

 The main groups of non-mammalian synapsids at Mikko's Phylogeny Archive

Prehistoric synapsid genera
Carboniferous synapsids of North America
Taxa named by Alfred Romer
Fossil taxa described in 1937